Just Look at Me Now may refer to: 

"Just Look at Me Now", Chumbawamba (1995) Swingin' with Raymond
"Just Look at Me Now", Bachman–Turner Overdrive (1984 album)
"Just Look at Me Now", Right-On (Charly Antolini album)
Just Look at Me Now (2010) Nell Dixon